Lee Roy Murphy (born July 16, 1958) is a retired American professional boxer. He held the IBF cruiserweight title from 1984 to 1986.

Amateur career
Murphy represented Chicago at three consecutive Intercity Golden Gloves dispatching his rivals with the first-round knockouts in 1977 and 1978, and winning the 1979 Light Heavyweight National Golden Gloves and earning a spot on the 1980 United States Olympic team. However, as the USA boycotted the 1980 Summer Olympics in Moscow due to political reasons, Murphy and the rest of his team were not allowed an Olympic berth. Murphy did however receive one of 461 Congressional Gold Medals created especially for the spurned athletes. Instead the U.S. team dispatched first to the West Germany for a match-up with the West German national team, and then to Kenya, to compete in the inaugural Gold Cup international boxing tournament funded partially by the U.S. State Department, for the benefit of countries which boycotted the Summer Olympics. He is now 64 with his wife Barbara and his daughter Ariel Murphy with his grandchildren Matthew Townsend, Brooklyn Lewis, and Eloni Lewis. 

Leeroy Murphy was inducted in the Hall of Fame for Los Angeles California in May of 2022.

Highlights

 Chicago Golden Gloves (165 lbs), International Amphitheatre, Chicago, Illinois, March 1976:
 (no data available)
USA–USSR Duals (165 lbs), Las Vegas, Nevada, January 1977:
Lost to Gennadiy Tolmachyov (Soviet Union) by decision
National Golden Gloves (165 lbs), Honolulu, Hawaii, March 1977:
1/4: Lost to Keith Broom by decision
 Chicago Golden Gloves (165 lbs), International Amphitheatre, Chicago, Illinois, March 1977:
Finals: Defeated Mark Scully by unanimous decision, 5–0
 35th Intercity Golden Gloves (165 lbs), Madison Square Garden, New York City, April 1977:
Defeated Paul Christiani KO 1
AAU National Championships (178 lbs), Ohio State Fair, Columbus, Ohio, August 1977:
Finals: Lost to Mark Frazie by decision 
USA–Romania Duals (178 lbs), Milwaukee, Wisconsin, January 1978:
Lost to Constantin Dafinoiu (Romania) by decision
National Golden Gloves (178 lbs), Albuquerque, New Mexico, March 1978:
1/16: Defeated Dennis Stanley KO 2
1/8: Defeated Sonny Westbrook RSC 1
1/4: Defeated Ron Brown by decision
1/2: Lost to Charles Singleton by decision
 Chicago Golden Gloves (178 lbs), International Amphitheatre, Chicago, Illinois, April 1978:
Finals: Defeated Willie Phillips
 36th Intercity Golden Gloves (178 lbs), Chicago, Illinois, April 1978:
Defeated Ron Huston KO 1
 Chemistry Cup (178 lbs), Halle, East Germany, June 1978:
Finals: Lost to Michael Seefeldt (East Germany) RSC 1
National Sports Festival (178 lbs), Fort Carson, Colorado, July 1978:
1/2: Lost to Elmer Martin by decision

USA–USSR Duals (178 lbs), Troy, New York, February 1979:
Lost to Nikolay Yerofeyev (Soviet Union) by decision
USA–Poland Duals (178 lbs), Milwaukee, Wisconsin, February 1979:
Defeated Jacek Kucharczyk (Poland) by split decision, 2–1
 National Golden Gloves (178 lbs), Indianapolis, Indiana, March 1979:
1/2: Defeated Steve Adams RSC 1
Finals: Defeated Alvino Manson KO 1
 37th Intercity Golden Gloves (178 lbs), Madison Square Garden, New York City, April 1979:
Defeated Porfirio Llanes RSC 1 
Pan Am Trials (178 lbs), Toledo, Ohio, May 1979:
1/2: Lost to Andre McCoy by split decision, 2–3
USSR–USA Duals (178 lbs), Moscow, Soviet Union, January 1980:
Defeated Nikolay Yerofeyev (Soviet Union) by split decision, 2–1
National Golden Gloves (178 lbs), Hirsch Memorial Coliseum, Shreveport, Louisiana, March 1980:
1/8: Defeated Thomas Landry by split decision, 3–2
1/4: Defeated Jay Strickland by decision
1/2: Lost to Bernard Benton by decision
Olympic Trials (178 lbs), Atlanta, Georgia, June 1980:
1/4: Defeated Bluford Spencer RSC 3 
1/2: Defeated Steve Eden by unanimous decision, 5–0
Finals: Defeated Elmer Martin KO 1 
FRG–USA Duals, West Berlin, West Germany, July 1980:
Defeated Kurt Seiler (West Germany) by decision
 Gold Cup (178 lbs), Nairobi, Kenya, September 1980:
Finals: Defeated Danny Jackson (Puerto Rico) by decision

He finished his amateur career having 162 victories to his credit.

Professional career
Known as "Solid Gold", Murphy turned pro in 1980 and won the IBF Cruiserweight Title with a 14th-round TKO of Marvin Camel in 1984. He defended the title three times before losing the belt to Ricky Parkey in 1986. After the loss, Murphy's career drifted into obscurity with losses to Dwight Muhammad Qawi in 1987 and Mike Evans in 1991. He retired after the loss to Evans, but launched a brief comeback in 1998, winning both of his bouts.

Personal
Lee Roy's brother, Kenny Murphy, was also a prizefighter and fought Fabrice Tiozzo for the WBA Cruiserweight Title in 1999. He won four Intercity Golden Gloves' championships in 1977 at 165 lb. and in 1978 through 1980 at 178 lb. He married Barbara Murphy and they had they're only daughter Ariel Murphy. Now he is 64 retired from CTA, Living his best life.

Professional boxing record

See also
List of world cruiserweight boxing champions

References

External links

1958 births
Living people
American male boxers
African-American boxers
Boxers from Chicago
Cruiserweight boxers
Heavyweight boxers
World cruiserweight boxing champions
International Boxing Federation champions
National Golden Gloves champions
Congressional Gold Medal recipients